Zivania or zivana ( Turkish: Zivaniya) is a Cypriot pomace brandy produced from the distillation of a mixture of grape pomace and local dry wines made from Xynisteri and Mavro grapes. The name of zivania is derived from zivana which means pomace in the Greek dialect of Cyprus. Zivania is colourless and alcoholic with a light aroma of raisins. Its alcohol content varies, with 45% by volume being the typical value. As defined by law, zivania shall not have more than 60% alcohol content. Zivania contains no sugars and has no acidity.

History
It is unknown when zivania was first produced in Cyprus. Some believe that the method of producing zivania, which resembles that of producing tsipouro, was brought to Cyprus by monks of Mount Athos in the 15th century while others believe that zivania has been produced in Cyprus since the time the Republic of Venice ruled the island, around the end of the 15th century. Evidence of its continued production during Ottoman and British rule of the island comes from writers such as the British writer Samuel Baker who in 1879 reports: "...the refuse of skins and stalks is laid upon one side to ferment for the manufacture of raki, or spirit, by distillation...".

According to the Cyprus law regarding the regulation and control of grape products of 1965 (52/1965) ( zivania is defined as "an alcoholic drink containing no more than 60% alcohol per volume which is produced exclusively from the first distillation of wine, grapes and pomace that went through fermentation or raisins or any other remains of the same".

Since 1989,  zivania has been protected under EU regulations as a name for grape marc produced in Cyprus.

Production
The production of zivania starts with the pressing of mature healthy grapes to produce must. The density of the grape must is then checked with a Baumé hydrometer to ensure it has a density value of less than 13° Baumé. This is necessary for the must to achieve complete and proper fermentation. The grape must, together with pomace, are then placed in large containers and let to ferment. Traditionally, the must-pomace mixture was placed in large clay containers (pithos). As soon as the fermentation process has completed (i.e. the fermented must is checked and confirmed to have a value of less or equal to 0° Baumé), the fermented must-pomace mixture is transferred to the main container of the still (kazani) for the distillation.

The traditional zivania still is called lampikos (see also alembic) in the Greek dialect of Cyprus. In some villages of Cyprus, a single lampikos was usually shared by all villagers. The traditional zivania stills are similar to those used for tsikoudia in Crete.

Once the main container of the still is hermetically shut, fire is set under it. The fire is monitored and maintained in order to produce constant heat. The first zivania that comes from the still has the highest alcohol content, while the last taken out of the apparatus has a low alcohol content and it is called porakos. The first zivania is typically discarded as it is not good for drinking because it contains harmful chemicals or is used for massaging sore body parts.

Depending on the pre-distillation mixture, different qualities of zivania are produced:

 Zivania produced using only wine for the distillation
 Zivania produced using wine and pomace for the distillation
 Zivania produced using pomace, water and weak zivania

Storage and transportation
Zivania is usually stored in clean wooden or galvanised metal containers that can be sealed in order to contain evaporation. It can be transferred to glass bottles for short storage or consumption.

Consumption and other usage
Cypriots consume zivania throughout the year. During the summer, zivania is served ice cold.  Zivania is not usually consumed alone and it is typically served with dried nuts, loukoumi, shoushouko or small appetizers like Cypriot loukaniko, lountza and tsamarella.

Before the introduction of beer and other alcoholic drinks in Cyprus, the main alcoholic drinks Cypriots consumed were wine and zivania. In some villages of Cyprus, cinnamon is added to zivania giving it a distinct red colour, aroma and flavour. When zivania is left to age, it gains stronger flavour and aroma. Aged zivania is highly valued and is kept for consumption during special occasions or as a welcoming treat for visitors.

Zivania, in addition to its use as an alcoholic beverage, it is also used to treat wounds, for massaging sore body parts, as a remedy for colds and toothaches, and as a warming-up drink during the cold months of winter, especially in the villages of the Troodos mountains.

Authenticity
To establish the authenticity of zivania, chemical studies were contacted to investigate which of the metals analyzed constitute diagnostic parameters that establish authenticity. The results of the studies establish that zivania is related to the unique geological and climatic conditions existing on the island of Cyprus.

Photos

See also
 Pomace brandy
 Tsipouro
 Tsikoudia
 Rakia
 Pisco
 Grappa
 Aguardiente
 Törkölypálinka
 Chacha (brandy)
 Orujo

References

Greek distilled drinks
Cypriot cuisine
Pomace brandies